Frankfurt Cathedral, officially Imperial Cathedral of Saint Bartholomew is a Roman Catholic Gothic church located in the heart of Frankfurt am Main, Germany. It is dedicated to Saint Bartholomew.

It is the largest religious building in the city and a former collegiate church. Despite its common English name, it has never been a true cathedral (episcopal see), but is called the Kaiserdom (an "imperial great church" or imperial cathedral) or simply the Dom due to its importance as former election and coronation church of the Holy Roman Empire. As one of the major buildings of the Empire's history, it was a symbol of national unity, especially in the 19th century.

The present church building is the third church on the same site. Since the late 19th century, excavations have revealed buildings that can be traced back to the seventh century. The history is closely linked with the general history of Frankfurt and Frankfurt's old town because the cathedral had an associated role as the religious counterpart of the Royal Palace in Frankfurt.

History

Frankfurt Cathedral was an imperial collegiate church, termed Dom in German – a synecdoche for all collegiate churches used totum pro parte also for cathedrals -, and thus traditionally translated as cathedral in English. St. Bartholomew's is the main church of Frankfurt and was constructed in the 14th and 15th centuries on the foundation of an earlier church from the Merovingian time.

Since 1356, when the Golden Bull of 1356 was issued by Charles IV, Holy Roman Emperor, emperors of the Holy Roman Empire were elected in this collegiate church as kings in Germany, and from 1562 to 1792, emperors-elect were crowned here. The imperial elections were held in the Wahlkapelle, a chapel on the south side of the choir (Hochchor) built for this purpose in 1425 (See the Plan to the right) and the anointing and crowning of the emperors-elect as King of the Romans took place before the central altar–believed to enshrine part of the head of St. Bartholomew – in the crossing of the church, at the entrance to the choir (See the Plan to the right).

When the city of Frankfurt secularized, it appropriated the remaining Catholic churches and their endowments of earning assets, however, leaving the usage of the church buildings to the existing Catholic parishes. Thus St. Bartholomew's became of the city's dotation churches, owned and maintained by the city but used by Catholic or Lutheran congregations.

St. Bartholomew's was seen as symbol for national unity in Germany, especially during the 19th century. Although it had never been a bishop's seat, it was the largest church in Frankfurt and its role in imperial politics, including crowning of medieval German emperors, made the church one of the most important buildings of Imperial history.

In 1867, St. Bartholomew's was destroyed by a fire and rebuilt in its present style. During World War II, between October 1943 and March 1944, the old town of Frankfurt, the biggest old Gothic town in Central Europe, was devastated by six bombardments of the Allied Air Forces. The greatest losses occurred in an attack by the Royal Air Force on 22 March 1944, when more than a thousand buildings of the old town, most of them half-timbered houses, were destroyed.

St. Bartholomew's suffered severe damage; the interior was burned out completely. The building was reconstructed in the 1950s.

Frankfurt Cathedral Choir School

The Frankfurt Cathedral Choir School (German: Frankfurter Domsingschule), founded in 2011, is a mixed ecumenical children's and youth choir, which accompanies not only mass and evensongs, but also official receptions and openings. The Frankfurter Domsingschule offers any singer, regardless of their religious affiliation, age-based, free vocal basic training at regular rehearsals and valuable one-on-one and group vocal training or early musical education. This extensive basic training is unique for Frankfurt.

Notable people associated with the cathedral 
Conrad III of Dhaun, former provost 
Madern Gerthener, stonemason and architect who designed the cathedral
Johannes Jeep, organist
Joseph Weyland, Bishop of Fulda
Hans Abel, artist contributing to the stained glass

Notable burials
Johannes Karl von und zu Franckenstein, Prince-Bishop of Worms
Günther von Schwarzburg, anti-king and member of the House of Schwarzburg

Gallery

See also
List of Gothic Cathedrals in Europe

References

Further reading

External links

Dompfarrei St. Bartholomäus
Domturm
Frankfurter Domsingschule
 

Roman Catholic cathedrals in Hesse
Roman Catholic churches in Frankfurt
Gothic hall churches in Germany
Frankfurt-Altstadt
16th-century Roman Catholic church buildings in Germany
Roman Catholic churches completed in 1550
Imperial election (Holy Roman Empire)
Churches in the Diocese of Limburg